Operation  Bodenplatte, launched on 1 January  1945, was an attempt by the Luftwaffe to cripple Allied air forces in the Low Countries during the Second World War. The Germans husbanded their resources in the preceding months at the expense of the units defending against the Allied strategic bombing in what was a last-ditch effort to keep up the momentum of the German Army (Heer) during the stagnant stage of the Battle of the Bulge (codenamed "Operation Watch on the Rhine" ).

This is a list of all known casualties during the course of the operation.

Background
Despite the passage of time, there is still controversy regarding the extent of Allied losses. One author, Norman Franks, has pointed to what "some" historians call a "conspiracy to hide the true, unacceptable, total of aircraft destroyed". This theory has been aided in the conflicting totals quoted in official records and the apparent lack of detailed surviving reports. For example, some authors claim the Eindhoven airfield attack may have destroyed 141 Hawker Typhoons. RAF loss records refute this claim. Total figures give only 107 operational Typhoons; 17 were destroyed outright, nine damaged beyond repair, 10 badly damaged but repaired and 24 slightly damaged. In a more recent study, Fighter Command Losses of the Second World War: Volume 3, Operational Losses, Aircraft and Crews 1944–1945, the same author states that a report made by No. 85 Group RAF gave 127 operational aircraft destroyed and 133 damaged, while British personnel casualties were said to be 40 killed (11 pilots; six were killed in the air) and 145 wounded. In another report, dated 3 January 1945, losses were given as 120 destroyed and 73 damaged. 24 non-operational aircraft were also lost with 11 damaged. This included aircraft outside of RAF Second Tactical Air Force's control. The Air Force's losses were 73 destroyed and the same figure damaged, 12 non-operational aircraft destroyed and 11 damaged.

Werner Girbig in his book, Six Months to Oblivion: The Eclipse of the Luftwaffe Fighter Force, gives German losses, from their sources, as 137 destroyed (98 in the British sector and 39 in the American). Some 57 were shot down by Allied fighters and 80 by Allied anti-aircraft defences. Girbig notes a further 48 were lost to unknown causes making a total of around 200 fighters. The rest, the author attributes to German anti-aircraft fire ("flak"). His final total is given as 300. Girbig gives personnel losses as 151 pilots killed and 63 captured. Girbig gives Allied losses as roughly 500, including quoted figures according to Allied sources of 144 destroyed and 84 damaged for the RAF and 134 destroyed and 62 damaged for the USAAF. Girbig asserts that 65–75 were shot down in combat.

In recent years other authors have offered more detail on the losses of each side. John Manrho and Ronald Pütz, published their findings in Bodenplatte: The Luftwaffe's Last Hope. According to their figures, taken from German and Allied sources, which include the remains of German airmen found up until 2003, German casualties were 271 fighters destroyed, 65 single-engine fighters damaged and 9 twin-engine aircraft destroyed, and four damaged. Some 143 pilots were killed in action, 70 became prisoners of war and 21 were wounded in action. The Allies lost 305 aircraft destroyed and 190 aircraft damaged. A further 15 Allied aircraft were shot down and ten damaged. A further six were downed by other causes. Manrho and Pütz have also deduced that only 17 German aircraft are certain to have been shot down by German Flak. Even if aircraft with unknown fates are added, it still gives a figure of only 30–35. They state that the notion that one-third of the German aircraft were shot down by friendly fire is "myth".

Jochen Prien and Gerhard Stemmer in their book, Jageschwader 3 "Udet" in World War II, quoted Allied losses as being 340 destroyed with 84 heavily damaged from Allied records. Tertiary histories give varying figures; anywhere between 250 and 500 Allied aircraft destroyed. Steven Zaloga gives figures of 214 German aircrew killed or captured and 304 aircraft destroyed. In return, Allied losses are put at 144 lost on the ground, 62 damaged and 70 lost in aerial combat.

Loss statistics

Total Allied aerial losses
Allied aerial casualties directly related  to Bodenplatte:

Total German losses
German casualties related directly to Bodenplatte:

Jagdgeschwader 27 losses on 1 January 1945 numbered 18 pilots overall. Fifteen pilots were lost as a direct result of Bodenplatte.

References

Citations

Bibliography
 Bekker, Cajus. Angriffshöhe 4000. 
 Caldwell, Don.JG 26; Top Guns of the Luftwaffe. New York: Ballantine Books, 1991. 
 Caldwell, Donald L. (1994). JG 26 Photographic History of the Luftwaffe's Top Gun. Motorbooks International Publishers & Wholesalers. .
 
 
  
 Forsythe, Robert. JV 44; The Galland Circus. Burgess Hill, West Sussex, UK: Classic Publications, 1996. 
 Franks, Norman The Battle of the Airfields: 1 January 1945. Grub Street. 1994. London.  & 
 Franks, Norman Fighter Command Losses of the Second World War: Volume 3, Operational Losses, Aircraft and Crews 1944–1945. Incorporating Air Defence Great Britain and 2nd TAF Midland. 2000. London. 
 
 
 .
 .
 Johnson, J.E. Wing Leader (Fighter Pilots). London: Goodall Publications Ltd. 2000 (original edition 1956). .
 Manrho, John & Pütz, Ron. Bodenplatte: The Luftwaffe's Last Hope-The Attack on Allied Airfields, New Year's Day 1945. Ottringham, United Kingdom. Hikoki Publications. 
 National Archives. (2000) The Rise and Fall of the German Air Force, 1933–1945. 
  subscription required
 Prien, Jochen & Stemmer, Gerhard. Jagdgeschwader 3 "Udet" in World War II. Atlgen, Germany: Schiffer Military History, 2002. 
 
 Weal, John. Jagdgeschwader 27 'Afrika'. Osprey, London. 2003. 
 Weinberg, Gerhard. A World At Arms, Cambridge University Press: 2 edition, 2005, 
 Zaloga, Steven J., Gerrard, Howard. Battle of the Bulge (2). London: Osprey Publishing, 2004.

External links
 Squadron Log 1 January 1945 of 439 Squadron RCAF
 Operation Strength of JG 1 at the time of Unternehmen Bodenplatte
 To win the Winter Sky by Danyy S. Parker

Battle of the Bulge
Aerial operations and battles of World War II involving Germany
Aerial operations and battles of World War II involving the United Kingdom
Aerial operations and battles of World War II involving the United States